The 2022 STCC TCR Scandinavia Touring Car Championship season is the thirteenth season of the championship, the sixth after the adoption of the TCR specification. It started on 4th June at Ljungbyheds and finished on 1st October at Mantorp Park. Robert Dahlgren, in the CUPRA Leon Competición TCR, took his fourth drivers' title in his career, while his team, CUPRA Dealer Team - PWR Racing, took the team title. Axel Bengtsson, also in a CUPRA Leon Competición TCR, took the junior drivers' title, while Marius Solberg Hansen, in a Volkswagen Golf GTI TCR, took the Däckteam trophy.

Teams and drivers

Race calendar and results

Championship standings 

This year's scoring system, with points now being handed to the top 15 finishers.

Drivers' Championship

References

External links 
 

STCC TCR Scandinavia Touring Car Championshopb
STCC TCR Scandinavia Touring Car Championship